The 2001 XXXVII FIBA International Christmas Tournament "Trofeo Raimundo Saporta-Memorial Fernando Martín" was the 37th edition of the FIBA International Christmas Tournament. It took place at Raimundo Saporta Pavilion, Madrid, Spain, on 25 December 2001 with the participations of Real Madrid and Ural Great Perm.

Final

December 25, 2001

|}

References

FIBA International Christmas Tournament
2001–02 in European basketball
2001–02 in Russian basketball
2001–02 in Spanish basketball